North Lonsdale was a parliamentary constituency in north Lancashire.  It returned one Member of Parliament (MP)  to the House of Commons of the Parliament of the United Kingdom.

The constituency was created under the Redistribution of Seats Act 1885, when the two-seat North Lancashire constituency was replaced and divided by a number of single-seat divisions.

The North Lonsdale Rural District, which was created in 1894, nine years after the constituency was created, was at the time an exclave of Lancashire. The area is now in Cumbria.

Members of Parliament

Elections

Elections in the 1880s

Elections in the 1890s

Elections in the 1900s

Elections in the 1910s

References

Politics of Cumbria
Parliamentary constituencies in North West England (historic)
Constituencies of the Parliament of the United Kingdom established in 1885
Constituencies of the Parliament of the United Kingdom disestablished in 1918